Vincent Carrara (born 9 May 1905, date of death unknown) was a French racing cyclist. He rode in the 1928 Tour de France.

References

1905 births
Year of death missing
French male cyclists
Place of birth missing